Kurunegala Warriors cricket team is one of the five provincial cricket teams which make up the Sri Lankan domestic cricket structure representing mainly two districts of North Western Province, Sri Lanka, and with some nearby provinces. In previous occasions, the province was included in to Wayamba cricket team, where part of them was combined in this season as Kurunegala Warriors. The cricket team's first participation came during the Twenty20 competition known as the Inter-Provincial Twenty20 2016 season which was known as Super T20 Provincial Tournament.

The team plays their matches in Colombo R. Premadasa Stadium, though the home ground is Welagedara Stadium. Mahela Udawatte is the captain of the side. Chamara Kapugedera, Upul Tharanga and Nuwan Pradeep are some of the other notable current Test cricketers and Limited overs cricketers in the national side.

Current squad
The squad for the 2015–16 season as of 26 January 2016.

||  || Mahela Udawatte (c) ||  29 ||  Batsman ||  LHB ||  ROB
|-
||  || Lasith Abeyratne ||  22 ||  Wicket-keeper ||  LHB ||  
|-
||  || Rumesh Buddika ||  25 ||  Batsman ||  LHB ||  ROB 
|-
||  || Chaturanga de Silva ||  26 ||  Batsman ||  LHB ||  LO
|-
||  || Nuwan Pradeep ||  29 ||  Bowler ||  RHB ||  RMF
|-
||  || Oshada Fernando ||  23 ||  All-rounder ||  RHB ||  LB
|-
||  || Shehan Fernando ||  22 ||  All-rounder ||  RHB ||  ROB
|-
||  || Asela Gunaratne ||  30 ||  All-rounder ||  RHB ||  RMF
|-
||  || Imran Khan ||  23 ||  Bowler ||  LHB ||  RMF
|-
||  || Ishan Jayaratne ||  26 ||  All-rounder ||  RHB ||  RMF
|-
||  || Chamara Kapugedera ||  28 ||  All-rounder ||  RHB ||  RMF
|-
||  || Tharindu Kaushal ||  22 ||  Bowler ||  RHB ||  ROB
|-
||  || Maduka Liyanapathiranage ||  24 ||  All-rounder ||  RHB ||  ROB
|-
||  || Kasun Madushanka ||  24 ||  Bowler ||  RHB ||  RMF
|-
||  || Kusal Mendis ||  20 ||  Batsman ||  RHB ||  
|-
||  || Upul Tharanga ||  30 ||  Batsman ||  LHB ||  
|}
|}

References

Provincial Twenty20 teams
Sport in Kurunegala
Cricket clubs established in 2016
Sports clubs in Sri Lanka
Cricket in Kurunegala